Dhow is the generic name of a number of traditional sailing vessels with one or more masts with settee or sometimes lateen sails, used in the Red Sea and Indian Ocean region. Typically sporting long thin hulls, dhows are trading vessels primarily used to carry heavy items, such as fruit, fresh water, or other heavy merchandise, along the coasts of Eastern Arabia, East Africa, Yemen and coastal South Asia (Pakistan, India, Bangladesh). Larger dhows have crews of approximately thirty, smaller ones typically around twelve.

History
The exact origins of the dhow are lost to history.  Some claim that the sambuk, a type of dhow, may be derived from the Portuguese caravel.

The dhow was the ship of trade used by the Swahili. It was a dhow that transported a giraffe to Chinese Emperor Yong Le's court, in 1414. Another source suggests the ship that carried the giraffe to China was part of a large Chinese fleet led by Zheng He.

Ships that are similar to the dhow are mentioned or described in the 1001 Nights including various ports where they harboured. The dhow is also associated with the pearl trade.

The Yemeni Hadhrami people, as well as Omanis, for centuries came to Beypore, in Kerala, India for their dhows. This was because of the good timber in the Kerala forests, the availability of good coir rope, and the skilled shipwrights. In former times, the sheathing planks of a dhow's hull were held together by coconut rope. Beypore dhows are known as 'Uru' in Malayalam, the local language of Kerala. Settlers from Yemen, known as 'Baramis', or 'Daramis' which could be derived from the word 'Hardamis' are still active in making urus in Kerala.

Dhows were extensively used for the Indian Ocean slave trade, which the Royal Navy attempted to suppress. In his 1873 book, Captain G. L. Sulivan described "four different kinds of coasting dhows, as shown in the engravings, viz. the Bateele, the Badane, Bugala or genuine Dhow, and the Matapa boat".

Since the 20th century 

In the 1920s, British writers identified Al Hudaydah as the centre for dhow building. Those built in Al Hudaydah were smaller in size, and used for travel along the coasts. They were constructed of acacia found in Yemen. They are distinguishable for their smaller triangular sails on movable bases to harvest the irregular winds of the Red Sea.

Captain Alan Villiers (1903–1982) documented the days of sailing trade in the Indian Ocean by sailing on dhows between 1938 and 1939 taking numerous photographs and publishing books on the subject of dhow navigation.

Even to the present day, dhows make commercial journeys between the Persian Gulf and East Africa using sails as their only means of propulsion. Their cargo is mostly dates and fish to East Africa and mangrove timber to the lands in the Persian Gulf. They often sail south with the monsoon in winter or early spring, and back again to Arabia in late spring or early summer.

Navigation
For celestial navigation, dhow sailors have traditionally used the kamal, an observation device that determines latitude by finding the angle of the Pole Star above the horizon.

Types

 Baghlah – from the Arabic language word for "mule". A heavy ship, the traditional deep-sea dhow.
Baqarah or  – from the Arabic word for "cow". Old type of small dhow similar to the Battil.
 Barijah – small dhow.
 Battil – featured long stems topped by large, club-shaped stem heads.
 Badan – a smaller vessel requiring a shallow draft.
 Boum or dhangi – a large-sized dhow with a stern that is tapering in shape and a more symmetrical overall structure. The Arab boum has a very high prow, which is trimmed in the Indian version.
 Ghanjah or kotiya – a large vessel, similar to the Baghlah, with a curved stem and a sloping, ornately carved transom.
It is also used in Bahrain for the pearl industry. The word comes from jahāz, a Persian word for "ship".
 Jaliboot or jelbut.  A small to medium-sized dhow. It is the modern version of the shu'ai with a shorter prow stem piece. Most  are fitted with engines.
 Patamar, a type of Indian dhow.
Sambuk or sambuq – the largest type of dhow seen in the Persian Gulf today. It has a characteristic keel design, with a sharp curve right below the top of the prow. It has been one of the most successful dhows in history. The word is cognate with the Greek  sambúkē, ultimately from Middle Persian . 
 Shu'ai.  Medium-sized dhow. Formerly the most common dhow in the Persian Gulf used for fishing as well as for coastal trade.
 Zaruq – small dhow, slightly larger than a barijah
Dhoni – Maldivian traditional multi-purpose sail vessel.

The term "dhow" is sometimes also applied to certain smaller lateen-sail rigged boats traditionally used in the Red Sea, the eastern Mediterranean and the Persian Gulf area, as well as in the Indian Ocean from Madagascar to the Bay of Bengal. All these vessels have common elements with the dhow. On the Swahili Coast, in countries such as Kenya, the Swahili word used for dhow is "jahazi".

Gallery

See also

Felucca
Fusta
Kattumaram
Uru (boat)
Xebec

References

Bibliography 
 .

Further reading
 .
Clifford W. Hawkins, The dhow: an illustrated history of the dhow and its world.
Anthony Jack, Arab dhows.
 .
 .
 .
Henri Perrier, Djibouti's dhows.
A.H.J. Prins, Sailing from Lamu: A Study of Maritime Culture in Islamic East Africa. Assen: van Gorcum & Comp., 1965.
A.H.J. Prins. The Persian Gulf Dhows: Two Variants in Maritime Enterprise. Persica: Jaarboek van het Genootschap Nederland-Iran, No.II (1965–1966): pp. 1–18.
A.H.J. Prins. The Persian Gulf Dhows: Notes on the Classification of Mid-Eastern Sea-Craft. Persica: Jaarboek van het Genootschap Nederland-Iran, No.VI (1972–1974): pp. 157–1166. 
A.H.J. Prins. A Handbook of Sewn Boats. Maritime Monographs and Reports No.59. Greenwich, London:: National Maritime Museum, 1986.
Tessa Rihards, Dhow building : survival of an ancient craft.

External links

 .  Stadium based on the design of the Dhow.
 .
 .
 .
 .
 .
 .

 
Arabic words and phrases
Sailing rigs and rigging
Boat types
Tall ships